The Ministry of Cities is a cabinet-level federal ministry in Brazil, created on January 1, 2003.

History 
The ministry was created on January 1, 2003 following the inauguration of President Luiz Inácio Lula da Silva. According to The Guardian, "the ministry was set up to tackle the urban chaos of Brazil’s traffic-clogged megacities." 

On January 1, 2019, President Jair Bolsonaro had it merged with the Ministry of National Integration to form the Ministry of Regional Development, led by Minister Gustavo Canuto. 

Following Lula's victory over Bolsonaro in the 2022 presidential election, Lula went on to re-establish them ministry on January 1, 2023. The newly-appointed Minister of Cities, Jader Barbalho Filho, has pledged to rebuild the  public housing program.

References

External links
 Official site 

Government ministries of Brazil
Ministries established in 2003
2003 establishments in Brazil
Ministries disestablished in 2019
2019 disestablishments in Brazil